Q'aysiri (Aymara q'aysa a kind of potato, -(i)ri a suffix, also spelled Caysiri) is a mountain in the Andes of Bolivia, about  high. It is situated in the Oruro Department, Sajama Province, at the border of the Curahuara de Carangas Municipality and the Turco Municipality. Q'aysiri lies north-east of the mountain Chilli Qhata.

References 

Mountains of Oruro Department